Five vessels of the British Royal Navy have been named HMS Turbulent:

  was a  launched in 1805, captured by the Danes in 1808 and sold in 1814
  was a  launched in 1916. She served in World War I and was sunk at the Battle of Jutland on 1 June 1916
  was an  launched in 1919 and sold in 1936
  was a T-class submarine launched in 1941. She served in World War II and was sunk by either depth charges or a mine in the Mediterranean in May 1943
  was a  launched in 1982 and decommissioned in 2012

Royal Navy ship names